Seshan is a surname. Notable people with the surname include:

Srinivasan Seshan, American computer scientist and professor
N. K. Seshan (1927–1986), Indian politician
T. N. Seshan (1932–2019), Former Chief Election Commissioner of India

See also
Seshan, Russia, an abandoned village in [Chukotsky District]], Chukotka Autonomous Okrug